Here follows a list of notable alumni and faculty of the École normale supérieure. 

The term used in ENS slang for an alumnus is Archicube.

Alumni 
The year when they entered the ENS is in parenthesis.

Nobel laureates 
 Henri Bergson (1878) (1927 Nobel Prize in Literature)
 Claude Cohen-Tannoudji (1953) (1997 Nobel Prize in Physics)
 Pierre-Gilles de Gennes (1951) (1991 Nobel Prize in Physics)
 Gérard Debreu (1941) (1983 Bank of Sweden Prize in Economic Sciences in Memory of Alfred Nobel)
 Albert Fert (1957) (2007 Nobel Prize in Physics)
 Serge Haroche (1963) (2012 Nobel Prize in Physics)
 Alfred Kastler (1921) (1966 Nobel Prize in Physics)
 Gabriel Lippmann (1868) (1908 Nobel Prize in Physics)
 Louis Néel (1924) (1970 Nobel Prize in Physics)
 Jean-Baptiste Perrin (1891) (1926 Nobel Prize in Physics)
 Romain Rolland (1886) (1915 Nobel Prize in Literature)
 Paul Sabatier (1874) (1912 Nobel Prize in Chemistry)
 Jean-Paul Sartre (1924) (declined 1964 Nobel Prize in Literature)
 Esther Duflo (2019 Nobel Prize in Economics)

Fields Medal laureates 
The following Fields Medal recipients were educated at the École Normale Supérieure.
 Laurent Schwartz (1934): 1950 Fields Medalist
 Jean-Pierre Serre (1945): 1954 Fields Medalist
 René Thom (1943): 1958 Fields Medalist
 Alain Connes (1966): 1982 Fields Medalist
 Jean-Christophe Yoccoz (1975): 1994 Fields Medalist
 Pierre-Louis Lions (1975): 1994 Fields Medalist
 Laurent Lafforgue (1986): 2002 Fields Medalist
 Wendelin Werner (1987): 2006 Fields Medalist
 Cédric Villani (1992): 2010 Fields Medalist
 Ngô Bảo Châu (1992): 2010 Fields Medalist
 Hugo Duminil-Copin (2006): 2022 Fields Medalist

Sciences

Chemistry 

 David Zitoun (born 1975), Israeli material scientist

Medicine and biology 
 Stanislas Dehaene (1984), current Chair of Experimental Psychology at the Collège de France
Charles Chamberland, microbiologist, Known for Chamberland filter
Jean-Pierre Changeux, neuroscientist
 Louis Pasteur (1843), chemist and microbiologist, confirmed the germ theory of disease

Physics 

 Édouard Branly (1865)
 Léon Brillouin
 Marcel Brillouin (1878)
 Monique Combescure
 Hubert Curien (1945)
 Thomas Fink
 Jean Baptiste Joseph Fourier
 Paul Langevin (1894)
 Yves Rocard (1922)
 Georges Sagnac (1889)
 Eugene Bloch
 Hamdy Doweidar

Mathematics 

Nalini Anantharaman (1994)
 Roger Apéry (1936)
 Paul Emile Appell (1872)
 Cahit Arf (1932)
 René-Louis Baire (1892)
 Arnaud Beauville (1966)
 Marcel Berger (1948)
 Pierre Berthelot (1962)
 Philippe Biane (1981)
 Émile Borel (1889)
 Louis Boutet de Monvel (1960)
 Emmanuel Breuillard (1997)
 Marcel Brillouin (1874)
 Jean-Luc Brylinski (1971)
 François Bruhat (1948)
 Élie Cartan (1888)
 Henri Cartan (1923), co-founder of Bourbaki
 Pierre Cartier (1950)
 Claude Chevalley (1926), co-founder of Bourbaki
 Gustave Choquet (1934)
 Henri Cohen (1966)
 Yves Colin de Verdière (1964)
 Jean-Louis Colliot-Thélène (1966)
 Pierre Colmez (1981)
 Alain Connes (1966)
 Thierry Coquand (1980)
 Antoine Augustin Cournot (1821)
 Louis Couturat (1887)
 Jean Gaston Darboux (1891)
 Georges Darmois (1906)
 Patrick Dehornoy (1971)
 Jean Delsarte (1922), co-founder of Bourbaki
 Michel Demazure (1955)
 Arnaud Denjoy (1902)
 Jean Dieudonné (1924), co-founder of Bourbaki
 Jacques Dixmier (1942)
 Pierre Dolbeault (1944)
 Adrien Douady (1954)
 Paul Dubreil (1923)
 Marie-Louise Dubreil-Jacotin (1926)
 Hugo Duminil-Copin (2005)
 Charles Ehresmann (1927), co-founder of Bourbaki
 Ivar Ekeland (1963)
 Nicole El Karoui (1964)
 Hélène Esnault (1973)
 Pierre Fatou (1898)
 Jacqueline Ferrand (1936)
 Étienne Fouvry (1972)
 Maurice René Fréchet (1900)
 Évariste Galois (1829), originated Galois theory
 René Gateaux (1907)
 Roger Godement (1940)
 François Golse (1981)
 Édouard Goursat (1876)
 Alice Guionnet (1989)
 Jacques Hadamard (1884)
 Guy Henniart (1973)
 Jacques Herbrand (1925)
 Luc Illusie (1959)
 Hervé Jacquet (1959)
 Gaston Julia (1911)
 Fanny Kassel (2003)
 Jean-Louis Koszul (1940)
 François Labourie (1980)
 Vincent Lafforgue (1992)
 Gérard Laumon (1972)
 Jean-François Le Gall (1978)
 Henri Lebesgue (1894)
 Pierre Lelong (1931)
 Jean Leray (1926)
 André Lichnerowicz (1933)
 Jacques-Louis Lions (1950)
 François Loeser (1978)
 Édouard Lucas (1861)
 Bernard Malgrange (1947)
 Frank Merle (1982)
 Loïc Merel (1986)
 Paul-André Meyer (1954)
 Yves Meyer (1957)
 Paul Montel (1894)
 Sophie Morel (1999)
 André Néron (1943)
 Joseph Oesterlé (1973)
 Patrice Ossona de Mendez (1986)
 Henri Padé (1883)
 Paul Painlevé (1883)
 Bernadette Perrin-Riou (1974)
 Mihailo Petrović (1890)
 Charles Émile Picard (1874)
 Vincent Pilloni (2002)
 Charles Pisot (1929)
 Georges Poitou (1945)
 René de Possel (1923), co-founder of Bourbaki
 Victor Puiseux (1837)
 Michel Raynaud (1958)
 Raphaël Rouquier (1988)
 Laure Saint-Raymond (1994)
 Pierre Samuel (1940)
 Marie-Hélène Schwartz (1934)
 Sylvia Serfaty (1994)
 Jean-Claude Sikorav (1976)
 Christophe Soulé (1970)
 Jean-Marie Souriau (1942)
 Gheorghe Tzitzeica (1896)
 Jean-Louis Verdier (1955)
 Ernest Vessiot (1884)
 Paul Vidal de la Blache (1863), considered the founder of French modern geography
 Claire Voisin (1981)
 Jean-Loup Waldspurger (1972)
 André Weil (1922), co-founder of Bourbaki
 Jean-Pierre Wintenberger (1973)

Humanities 
 Jean Bousquet (1931), classicist, archaeologist (Delphi excavations), Director of ENS
François Déroche, orientalist, islamologist, and specialist in Codicology and Palaeography

Philosophy 
 Louis Althusser (1939), Marxist philosopher
 Raymond Aron (1924), political philosopher, founder of French conservative thought post-1960
 Alain Badiou, philosopher
 Étienne Balibar (1960), philosopher and linguist
 Georges Canguilhem (1924), philosopher of science
 Jean Cavaillès (1923), philosopher and Résistance hero
 Emile Auguste Chartier "Alain" (1889), philosopher
 Gustave Belot (1878), philosopher
 André Comte-Sponville (1972), philosopher and essayist
 Victor Cousin (1810), spiritualist philosopher and historian of philosophy
 Jacques Derrida (1952), founder of deconstruction
 Michel Foucault (1946), historian of systems of thought, member of Collège de France
 Georges Gusdorf (1933), philosopher and historian of ideas
 Jean Hyppolite (1924), founder of Hegelian studies in France
 Vladimir Jankélévitch (1922), philosopher, musicologist
 Quentin Meillassoux, philosopher
 Maurice Merleau-Ponty (1926), phenomenologist
 Jacques Rancière (1960), philosopher
 Philippe-Joseph Salazar (1975), rhetorician, member of College international de philosophie
 Jean-Paul Sartre (1924), philosopher, novelist, playwright, journalist
 Hippolyte Taine (1893)
 Simone Weil (1928), philosopher and mystic

Sociology 
 Jean-Michel Berthelot (1966)
 Raymond Boudon (1951)
 Pierre Bourdieu (1951)
 Émile Durkheim (1879), considered the founder of French sociology

Literature 
 Paul Bénichou (1927)
 Robert Brasillach, novelist, critic and pro-Nazi collaborationist
 Aimé Césaire (1935), poet and politician
 Marie Darrieussecq (1990), novelist
 Assia Djebar (1955), Algerian novelist and filmmaker
 Jean Giraudoux (1903), playwright
 Julien Gracq (1930), novelist and literary critic
 Sabiha Al Khemir (1982), writer, illustrator and expert in Islamic art
 Paul Nizan (1924)
 Charles Péguy (1894), poet
 Claude Ribbe (1974), historian and novelist
 Romain Rolland (1886), novelist
 Jules Romains (1906), novelist
 Éric-Emmanuel Schmitt (1980)

Literary criticism 
 Jean-Charles Darmon (1982)
 Gérard Genette (1951)
 Jean-Pierre Richard (1941)

Philology, grammar, linguistics
 Anatole Bailly (1853), hellenist
 Jean Bousquet (1931), hellenist
 Michel Bréal (1852), philologist
 Jérôme Carcopino (1901), specialist of Roman Antiquity
 Jacqueline de Romilly (1933), hellenist, specialist of the history and literature of Ancient Greece
 Antoine Culioli (1944), linguist
 Oswald Ducrot (1949), linguist, specialist of pragmatics
 Georges Dumézil (1916), philologist, linguist, caucasianist, specialist of Proto-Indo-European language and society
 Alexandre François (1992), linguist, specialist of Oceanic languages
 Numa Denis Fustel de Coulanges (1850), specialist of classical and mediaeval history
 Marcel Granet (1904), sinologist
 Pierre Grimal (1933), latinist
 Claude Hagège (1955), linguist
  (1963), linguist, specialist of pragmatics
 , specialist of Armenian and comparative linguistics of Indo-European languages
 Gilbert Lazard (1940), linguist, iranologist
 Christiane Marchello-Nizia (1961), specialist of Old French
  (1968), syntactician

History 
 Marc Bloch (1904), co-founder of the Annales School
 Lucien Febvre (1899), co-founder of the Annales School
 Henri Hauser (1885), economic historian
 Ernest Lavisse (1862), a founder of Positivist history
 Jacques Le Goff (1945), medievalist
 Emmanuel Le Roy Ladurie (1949), historian
 Neil MacGregor, art historian, Director of the British Museum
 Paul Mantoux (1894), economic historian
 Jacques Soustelle (1929), ethnologist
 Gilbert Dagron (1953), historian

Economics 

 Yves Balasko (1964)
 Esther Duflo (1992) 
 Emmanuel Farhi (1997)
 Xavier Gabaix (1991)
 Thomas Piketty (1989)
 Emmanuel Saez (1992)
 Christian Morrisson (1957)
 jean-Charles Asselain (1962)

Government and public policy 
 Léon Blum (1890) (expelled during his third year), first Socialist Prime Minister of France (1936)
 Pierre Brossolette (1922), politician and resistant
 Laurent Fabius (1966), Prime Minister of France, 1984-1986
 Édouard Herriot (1891), Prime Minister of France, 1924-1925, 1926 and 1932
 Jean Jaurès (1878), Socialist leader
 Alain Juppé (1964), Prime Minister of France 1995-1997
 Bruno Le Maire (1989), Minister of the Economy, 2017-present ; Minister of Agriculture 2009-2012
 Benny Lévy (1965), founder of Gauche prolétarienne
 Paul Painlevé (1883), mathematician; Prime Minister of France in 1917 and 1925
 Georges Pompidou (1931), Prime Minister of France 1962-1968; President of France 1969-1974
 Michel Sapin (1974), Finance Minister 1992-1993; Minister of Civil Servants and State Reforms 2000-2002
 Laurent Wauquiez (1994), President of The Republicans, 2017-present ; Minister of Higher Education 2011-2012

Business 
 Philippe Camus (1967), Chairman of Alcatel Lucent
 Isabelle Kocher (1987), CEO of Engie 
 Anne Lauvergeon (1978), former President of Areva
 Jean-Charles Naouri  (1967), CEO of Groupe Casino

Faculty 
 Louis Althusser
 Alain Badiou
 Samuel Beckett, 1969 Nobel Prize in Literature
 Pierre Bonnet
 Paul Celan
 John Coates
 Victor Cousin
 Numa Denis Fustel de Coulanges
 Jacques Derrida
 Alfred Des Cloizeaux
 Laurent Freidel
 Michael Ghil
 Jacques Lacan
 Ernest Lavisse
 Alfred Kastler, 1966 Nobel Prize in Physics
 Thomas MacGreevy
 Jacqueline de Romilly
 Jean-Pierre Serre, 1954 Fields Medal
 Michel Soutif, 1942
Christian Lorenzi (2005), Professor of Experimental Psychology, he was a former director of the Department of Cognitive Studies and Director of Scientific Studies

Sources 
Dates of entrance at the ENS can be checked at https://web.archive.org/web/20071009092113/http://www.archicubes.ens.fr/

References 

Ecole normale superieure